Vaceuchelus cretaceus is a species of sea snail, a marine gastropod mollusk in the family Chilodontidae.

Description
The height of the whitish to dirty buff shell attains 8.5 mm. The shell has an elevated  turbiniform shape with 4.5 to 5 whorls. The columella has a typical low, rounded swelling at its base.

Distribution
This species occurs in the southwestern Indian Ocean, off Réunion, Southern Mozambique and Northern KwaZulu-Natal

References

External links
 To World Register of Marine Species
 

cretaceus
Gastropods described in 2012